Manhattan Beach may refer to:

Places
In the United States:
 Manhattan Beach, California
 Manhattan Beach (Denver), Colorado, first amusement park built west of the Mississippi River (1881) that burnt down in 1908 and was rebuilt as Luna Park
 Manhattan Beach (Florida), now part of Hanna Park, an historically African-American beach during the 20th century near Jacksonville Beach
 Manhattan Beach, Minnesota
 Manhattan Beach, Brooklyn, New York

Arts, entertainment, and media
 "Manhattan Beach" (march), by John Philip Sousa
Manhattan Beach (novel), a 2017 novel by Jennifer Egan